The Saint Andrew's Hall is a concert venue located in Detroit, Michigan. Formerly the meeting place for the Saint Andrew's Society of Detroit. The Shelter lies underneath St. Andrews Hall and hosts various live music acts and DJs. It is known for being one of the first stages on which Eminem performed.

History
Since 1980, the venue has been bringing trendsetting music to Detroit. The hall has hosted famous breakthrough acts during the '80s and '90s, such as the Insane Clown Posse, Iggy Pop, Bob Dylan, Paul Simon, The Verve, Tool, Skinny Puppy, Nirvana, R.E.M., No Doubt, Icehouse, James, The Cranberries, and the Red Hot Chili Peppers .

Morphine: Bootleg Detroit, a fan recording of Morphine's 1st appearance at St. Andrew's Hall on March 7, 1994, was released by the band following the death of frontman Mark Sandman.

Electric Six, a band originally from Detroit, filmed a concert at St. Andrew's Hall on September 7, 2013, entitled Absolute Treasure.

Noted performers

The Adicts
The Alarm
Bauhaus
Black Flag
Iggy Pop
New Order
Nina Hagen
Dead Kennedys
The Lords of the New Church
Psychedelic Furs
Echo & the Bunnymen
The Cramps
Rank and File
R.E.M.
Rhythm Corps
The Verve
Love and Rockets
Majesty Crush
The Bangles
The Beastie Boys
Bad Manners
Sun Ra
Nirvana
Pearl Jam
Foo Fighters
Red Hot Chili Peppers
Radiohead
Nick Cave and the Bad Seeds
Figures on a Beach
Fishbone
Seether
Jane's Addiction
The Damned
The Pogues
Camper Van Beethoven
Delta Spirit
The Weeknd
Collective Soul
Sleigh Bells
The Suicide Machines
The Reverend Horton Heat
The Strokes
Insane Clown Posse
Husker Du
Halsey
Jason & the Scorchers
The Hard Lessons
Chris Whitley
Garbage
Goober & The Peas
Bad Brains
Monster Magnet
Blues Traveler
Rage Against the Machine
Throwing Muses
Slum Village
The Showdown
Joe Strummer & the Mescaleros
Manchester Orchestra
The Replacements
Skinny Puppy
Frank Turner & The Sleeping Souls
The Mowgli's
The Jesus Lizard
Kacey Musgraves
The Mighty Mighty Bosstones
Enrique Bunbury
Smashing Pumpkins
Tool
Jake Miller
The Butthole Surfers
Jessica Hernandez & the Deltas
Alien Sex Fiend
Dead Milkmen
Wayne Kramer
Dread Zeppelin
Fear
GBH
The Story So Far
Eric Roberson
Sonic Youth
GWAR
Matthew Sweet
This or the Apocalypse
No Doubt
Big Chief
The Offspring
Cody Simpson
The Blasters
Ubiquitous Synergy Seeker
Jesus And Mary Chain
New Politics
G. Love & Special Sauce
Cracker
Karmin
Buffalo Tom
Stone Temple Pilots
Lights
Morphine
X
Lily Allen
The Cranberries
My Chemical Romance
Adele
Corey Smith
Awolnation
Alice in Chains
Dinosaur Jr.
GG Allen
Hoobastank
James
London Grammar
Blur
Toad the Wet Sprocket
Queens of the Stone Age
House of Love
Soundgarden
New Found Glory
Bob Dylan
Cage The Elephant
Social Distortion
Real Friends
Shane MacGowan & The Popes
The Early November
Megadeath
Doll Skin
Nine Inch Nails
Paramore
John Legend
Matt Nathanson
MellowHigh
Screaming Trees
Red Fang
Mother Love Bone
Silverstein
Primal Scream
Meek Mill
The Jayhawks 
Witch Mountain
Steve Earle
Eminem
Twiztid
Fun (band)
Built To Spill
Taking Back Sunday
TV On The Radio
Walk the Moon
Old 97's
Twenty One Pilots
Helmet
Meat Puppets
Motion City Soundtrack
My Morning Jacket
Mike Watt
Bazzi (singer)
Bleachers (band)
Jimmy Eat World
The Black Crowes
blink-182
The Gutter Twins
Fall Out Boy
Imagine Dragons
Electric Six
The Devil Makes Three
Phish
Stevie Ray Vaughan
My Bloody Valentine
Ride
Slowdive
D12
Drive-By Truckers
The Busboys
Moby
Clutch
The Jon Spencer Blues Explosion
Zebrahead
The Detroit Cobras
Whitey Morgan and the 78's
The Go-Betweens
fIREHOSE
Belly
Breeders
PJ Harvey
Laughing Hyenas
Gary Clark Jr.
Wiz Khalifa

References

Music venues in Michigan
Theatres in Detroit
Concert halls in Michigan
Buildings and structures in Detroit
Buildings and structures completed in 1908
Live Nation Entertainment